Roadside 165F is an Indian reserve of the Canoe Lake Cree First Nation in Saskatchewan.

References

Indian reserves in Saskatchewan
Division No. 18, Saskatchewan